Podvisoki was a medieval settlement, a castle town (in ), as part of wider area just beneath of the fortress Visoki, located on the Visočica hill above modern-day Visoko, Bosnia and Herzegovina.

History 
Podvisoki was main trading center over course much of the history of Bosnian medieval state from the mid 14 century. The first direct mention was in 1363. It was located along river Fojnica, in the foothills of Visočica hill, Visoko. Podvisoki was one of the early examples of medieval urban settlement in Bosnia region.

Podvisoki had a colony of Ragusan merchants. They remained there until 1430s, when they moved to Fojnica. Notable local merchant from Visoko in 14th century was Milaš Radomirić. Ragusan sources cite biggest caravan trade between Podvisoki and Ragusa in 1428. That year, on 9 August, Vlachs committed to Ragusan lord Tomo Bunić, that they will with 600 horses deliver 1500 modius of salt. Delivery was meant for Dobrašin Veseoković, and Vlachs price was half of delivered salt.

At the end of 14. century merchants from Podvisoki took part in slave trade. It was recorded, that on November 1389 Bogovac Vukojević (Bogaueç Vochoeuich Bossinensis de Souisoch) traded small boy Milko, a Bosnian (de genere et nactione Bossinensium), for the price of 4 ducats.

See also 

 Visoko during the Middle Ages
 Old town of Visoki
 Mile

References

Literature 
 Pavao Anđelić, Srednji vijek – Doba stare bosanske države, „Visoko i okolina kroz historiju I, Visoko 1984.

History of Visoko
Medieval Bosnia and Herzegovina
Medieval Bosnian state
Kingdom of Bosnia
Economic history of Bosnia and Herzegovina
Castles in Bosnia and Herzegovina